Pitt v PHH Asset Management Ltd [1994] 1 WLR 327 is an English contract law case, which confirmed the enforceability of lockout agreements.

Facts
In Parsonage Lane, Chelsworth, Suffolk, is a residence known as "The Cottage". PHH Asset Management Ltd were undisclosed agents of mortgagees, who were selling The Cottage for £205,000. Mr Pitt and Miss Buckle put in competing bids. Mr Pitt bid £200,000, which PHH accepted 'subject to contract'. Miss Buckle then increased her bid to £210,000. PHH withdrew its acceptance of Mr Pitt.

Mr Pitt threatened to sue for an injunction, to compel transfer of the cottage to him (it was noted in the Court of Appeal that this probably would have not succeeded, and just caused nuisance). So PHH agreed to sell to him and said they would consider no further offers. This is known as a "lock out agreement". But then, PHH sold to Miss Buckle anyway. Mr Pitt sued. PHH argued in its defence, there was no consideration to not consider further offers (for the lock out agreement), because Mr Pitt had only promised to be ready, willing and able to proceed with exchange of contracts, and he was already obliged to do that.

Judgment
Peter Gibson LJ held there was consideration. First, Mr Pitt had agreed to not apply for an injunction. Even though the claim may not have worked, PHH was freed from the 'nuisance value' of defending the claim. Second he had agreed not to make nuisance with Miss Buckle. Third, the promise to proceed within two weeks was consideration. Mann LJ agreed and Sir Thomas Bingham MR gave the following judgment.

See also
Law of Property (Miscellaneous Provisions) Act 1989 s 2

Notes

References
Ewan McKendrick, Contract Law (7th edn Palgrave 2007) 91, says that being freed from the nuisance as being "good consideration" does not sit easily with White v Bluett.

English agreement case law
Court of Appeal (England and Wales) cases
1993 in case law
1993 in British law